Nzinga may refer to:

People 
 Nzinga of Ndongo and Matamba (c. 1583–1663), Central African warrior queen
 João I of Kongo, also known as Nzinga a Nkuwu or Nkuwu Nzinga
 Afonso I of Kongo (c. 1456–1542 or 1543), also known as Mvemba a Nzinga or Nzinga Mbemba
 Nzinga Blake (born 1981), American/Sierra Leonean actress
 Christian Nzinga (born 1985), French-born Angolan footballer currently playing for Floridians FC in Florida
 Daniel Ntongi-Nzinga (born 1946), peace activist and Christian leader in Angola
 Héritier Luvumbu Nzinga (born 1994), Congolese footballer

Places 
 Nzinga, Nyanga, Gabon, in Nyanga Province
 Nzinga, Ogooué-Ivindo, Gabon, in the province of Ogooué-Ivindo
 Nzinga, Central African Republic, a port in the Central African Republic
 Nzinga Tchi, in Nyanga Province, Gabon

Other uses 
 Nzinga (leafhopper), a leafhopper genus in the tribe Erythroneurini

African feminine given names